The "Cambridge Mafia" is a pejorative term denoting a group of British Conservative Party politicians, front-rank members of their party during the 1980s and 1990s, who attended the University of Cambridge at roughly the same time in the early 1960s. Many of them served as Chairman of the Cambridge University Conservative Association, or President of the Cambridge Union Society, and several of them held both offices. Apart from Leon Brittan, none of them attained great academic distinction at university. The group's contemporaries at Cambridge included satirist and journalist David Frost and comedian Peter Cook (both of whom were active in Footlights at the time), Canadian Supreme Court justice Ian Binnie, historian Angus Calder, Liberal Democrat politician Vince Cable, and Jonathan Lynn, co-writer of Yes Minister, who was inspired to satirise politicians after encountering the group at the Cambridge Union Society.

The period of prominence of the "Mafia" was something of an aberration for the Conservative Party, which traditionally has closer links to Oxford than Cambridge. Between 1955 and 1990 the party had been led by five consecutive Oxford graduates (Anthony Eden, Harold Macmillan, Alec Douglas-Home, Edward Heath and Margaret Thatcher). In turn, the "Mafia" has been succeeded by a newer generation of Conservative politicians, again led by Oxford graduates (notably David Cameron, William Hague, George Osborne, Philip Hammond, Theresa May, Boris Johnson, Liz Truss, Jeremy Hunt and Rishi Sunak).

The "Mafia" were of relatively modest social background: Norman Fowler, Michael Howard and Kenneth Clarke had attended grammar school rather than fee-paying schools. In his memoirs, Fowler records that during his National Service, although he became a commissioned officer, it was in an ordinary county regiment (in his case, the Essex Regiment) rather than the fashionable Guards or cavalry regiments favoured by young men from upper-class backgrounds. (Most members of the "Cambridge Mafia" just missed having to serve, because National Service was abolished in 1960.)

They included:

A famous photograph, reproduced in a number of biographies of Clarke and Howard, shows Brittan and Gummer as ushers at Clarke's wedding shortly after his graduation, with Fowler, Howard and Lamont also present.

It should not be assumed that these men all operated as a cohesive unit throughout their careers. Brittan and Fowler—who were slightly older—were Cabinet Ministers in the 1980s, earlier than the others. Howard entered Parliament in 1983, much later than his contemporaries, having first had a successful career as a barrister. In the early part of 1993 Clarke and Howard (both of whom angled publicly for the job—it was given to Clarke) both pushed for the removal of Lamont as Chancellor of the Exchequer. Clarke and Howard were rivals for the party leadership in 1997, and almost again in 2003—although in the event Clarke did not stand, and Howard was elected unopposed. (Howard had not been a candidate in the 2001 contest, in which Iain Duncan Smith had defeated Clarke.)

Howard was the only member of the group to become party leader, and none became Prime Minister. By the time the Conservatives returned to government in 2010, Clarke and Lilley were the only members of the group who remained in the House of Commons; Clarke was appointed Secretary of State for Justice and Lord Chancellor.

References

External links
A BBC radio discussion

Conservative Party (UK) factions
Conservative Party (UK) terms
History of the Conservative Party (UK)
People associated with the University of Cambridge
History of Cambridge
Politics of Cambridge